Dindo may refer to:

 Dindo Yogo, real name Théodore Dindo Mabeli (1955–2000), a Congolese singer and musician
 Rinaldo Capello (born 1964), also known as Dindo Capello, an Italian endurance racing driver
 Richard Dindo (born 1944), a Swiss documentary film director
 Dindo Sicat, a character in Ang Tanging Pamilya: A Marry Go Round
 Typhoon Dindo (disambiguation), several tropical storms
 Dindo, Bosnia and Herzegovina, a village in the municipality of Konjic, Bosnia and Herzegovina